Lucas Johansen (born November 16, 1997) is a Canadian professional ice hockey defenceman who currently plays for the Hershey Bears in the American Hockey League (AHL) while under contract to the Washington Capitals of the National Hockey League (NHL). Johansen was drafted 28th overall in the 2016 NHL Entry Draft by the Capitals.

Playing career
Johansen was originally drafted by the Kelowna Rockets, 119th overall in the 2012 WHL Bantam draft, and played two seasons of midget hockey in the BC Hockey Major Midget League with the Vancouver North East Chiefs before he joining the Rockets for the 2014–15 season.

On March 2, 2017, Johansen was signed to a three-year, entry-level contract with the Washington Capitals. At the conclusion of his third season with the Rockets in 2016–17, Johansen signed an amateur try-out contract to join the Capitals American Hockey League affiliate, the Hershey Bears, during their post-season run on May 2, 2017. He trained without making an appearance for the Bears during their second round defeat.

Johansen was cut from the 2017–18 Washington Capitals training camp so he started the 2017–18 season with Hershey.

Personal life
Lucas' older brother Ryan is a forward who currently plays for the Nashville Predators.

Career statistics

References

External links
 

1997 births
Living people
Canadian ice hockey defencemen
Hershey Bears players
Kelowna Rockets players
National Hockey League first-round draft picks
Washington Capitals draft picks
Washington Capitals players